Krylatskoye may refer to:

 Krylatskoye District
 Krylatskoye (Moscow Metro)
 Krylatskoye Sports Palace, Moscow
 Ice Palace Krylatskoye, Moscow